Karin Knapp was the defending champion, having won the event in 2012, but decided not to participate in 2013.

Claire Feuerstein won the title, defeating Nastja Kolar in the final, 6–1, 7–6(7–2).

Seeds

Main draw

Finals

Top half

Bottom half

References 
 Main draw

Save Cup - Singles
Save Cup
2013 in Italian sport